Restoration Ministries Christian Academy (RMCA) is a private K-12 Christian school located in Indianola, Mississippi. An outreach ministry of the Restoration Ministries of the Apostolic Faith, it as of 2015 has 84 students from the counties of Humphreys, Leflore, Sunflower, and Washington. Its student body is mostly black, and many black families wishing to avoid the public school system, as of 2012, choose to enroll their children in RMCA instead of the majority white Indianola Academy.

It was established in 2005 by Richard and Vivian Michelle Jenkins, two pastors.

It holds an annual May Day and on that day it gives the titles of "king and queen" to a pair of students from the elementary level and a pair of students from the high school level.

References

External links
 Restoration Ministries Christian Academy
 "Restoration Ministries Christian Academy." Restoration Ministries of the Apolostic Faith.
 Entry at the National Center for Education Statistics

Christian schools in Mississippi
Private K-12 schools in Mississippi
2005 establishments in Mississippi
Educational institutions established in 2005
Schools in Sunflower County, Mississippi